The Blood Beast Terror is a 1968 British horror film directed by Vernon Sewell and starring Peter Cushing, Robert Flemyng and Wanda Ventham, released by Tigon in February 1968. In the United States it was released by Pacemaker Pictures on a double-bill with Slaughter of the Vampires under the title The Vampire Beast Craves Blood.  The film is also known as Blood Beast From Hell and Deathshead Vampire. The budget was circa £40,000 and this was the first film to be made under the Tigon British Film Productions banner. The Sorcerers (1967), made by the company under the corporate name of Tony Tenser Films Ltd was latter rebranded Tigon.

Story
In 19th century Britain, a series of grisly murders are taking place in the countryside near London. The victims are good-looking young men, between the ages of twenty and thirty, and all have had their throats torn open and their blood drained. The witness of the latest murder, a coachman named Joe Trigger, is driven insane when he catches a glimpse of the mysterious killer.

Investigating the deaths are Detective Inspector Quennell of Scotland Yard and his assistant, Sergeant Allan. Because Joe keeps ranting about a horrible winged creature with huge eyes, Quennell hatches a theory that perhaps a homicidal eagle is on the loose. At the scene of the latest killing, several shiny scales are discovered.

The two latest victims were students of the renowned entomology professor Dr. Carl Mallinger, who lives nearby with his beautiful daughter Clare, and their scar-faced butler, Granger. When Quennell brings the scales to Mallinger for identification, Mallinger behaves suspiciously and tries to take all of them. Quennell describes his theory about a killer eagle, but Mallinger dismisses it outright. Quennell is unaware that the entomologist has a pet eagle, which the sadistic Granger torments.

Explorer and naturalist Frederick Britewell returns from Africa with some moth chrysalids for Dr. Mallinger and the handsome young adventurer soon becomes a victim of Clare, who is the real murderer; Clare is a "were-moth" and transforms at night to drink the blood of young men. Britewell becomes her latest victim after watching her in an amateur horror play performed by some of her father's students (which seems to be a spoof of the Hammer Frankenstein genre) but lives long enough to exclaim, "Death's head!" to Quennell before he dies. Both Mallinger and Clare claim not to have known Britewell when questioned by Quennell.

Quennell's superior suggests he takes a holiday and delegate the case to Sgt. Allan, but the Detective Inspector refuses. He reveals his intention to send his daughter Meg to stay with some relatives in Sussex until the investigation is over. As they leave for the railway station, Allan informs Quennell that Dr. Mallinger did in fact know Frederick Britewell, prompting Quennell to perform an immediate search of Mallinger's home. He finds that the scientist and his daughter have left for Upper Higham. He also discovers a cellar filled with human bones and Granger's corpse.

Quennell informs his superior he will be taking leave after all: he and Meg go to Upper Highham incognito as a vacationing banker named Thompson and his daughter. There they meet a young bug collector who shows him the proudest exhibit in his collection, a Deathshead moth, and Quennell discovers that Mallinger is also incognito as a "Dr. Miles" staying at a nearby estate. Can he stop Mallinger, who is attempting to create a male were-moth to be a mate for his increasingly bloodthirsty daughter?

Cast
 Peter Cushing as Inspector Quennell
 Robert Flemyng as Dr. Carl Mallinger
 Wanda Ventham as Clare Mallinger / Were-moth
 Vanessa Howard as Meg Quennell
 Glynn Edwards as Sgt. Allan
 William Wilde as Frederick Britewell
 Kevin Stoney as Granger
 David Griffin as William Warrender
 John Paul as Mr. Warrender
 Leslie Anderson as Joe Trigger
 Simon Cain as Clem Withers
 Norman Pitt as Police Doctor
 Roy Hudd as Smiler
 Russell Napier as Landlord
 Robert Cawdron as Chief Constable
 Kenneth Colley as James
 Beryl Cooke as Housekeeper

References

External links

1968 horror films
1968 films
1960s historical horror films
1960s monster movies
British historical horror films
British monster movies
Films set in the 19th century
1960s science fiction horror films
Films directed by Vernon Sewell
Mad scientist films
Films set in London
British exploitation films
British science fiction horror films
British vampire films
1960s English-language films
1960s British films